Trimerodytes is a genus of snakes in the subfamily Natricinae of the family Colubridae. The genus is endemic to East Asia and Southeast Asia.

Species
The genus Trimerodytes contains 7 species which are recognized as being valid.
Trimerodytes aequifasciatus  – Asiatic annulate keelback, Asiatic water snake
Trimerodytes annularis  – red-bellied annulate keelback, ringed water snake
Trimerodytes balteatus  – Hainan mountain keelback
Trimerodytes percarinatus  – eastern water snake, olive keelback, olive annulate keelback, Chinese keelback water snake
Trimerodytes praemaxillaris  – Angel's mountain keelback, brown stream snake
Trimerodytes yapingi  – Jingdong water snake
Trimerodytes yunnanensis  – Yunnan water snake, Yunnan annulate keelback

Nota bene: A binomial authority in parentheses indicates that the species was originally described in a genus other than Trimerodytes.

References

Further reading
Rossman, Douglas A.; Eberle, W. Gary (1977). "Partition of the Genus Natrix, with Preliminary Observations on Evolutionary Trends in Natricine Snakes". Herpetologica 33 (1): 34–43. (Sinonatrix, new genus).

 
Snakes of Asia
Taxa named by Edward Drinker Cope